Browns, Missouri may refer to:

 Browns, Boone County, Missouri, an unincorporated community
 Browns, Scott County, Missouri, an unincorporated community

See also
Browns (disambiguation)#Places